In the National Basketball Association, players born outside of the United States are often known as international players. Players who were born in U.S. overseas territories, such as Puerto Rico and the U.S. Virgin Islands, are considered international players even if they are U.S. citizens. In some borderline cases, the NBA takes into consideration whether a player desires to be identified as international. Additionally, there are players who  are U.S. citizens on account of being born there but who also have additional citizenships or have represented other countries in international basketball competition. This list contains all players who fulfill at least one of these conditions.

Players whose nationality is listed as United States were born outside of the country but have represented them in international basketball tournament. Players who were born outside the United States to U.S. parents and players who became naturalized U.S. citizens are also included in that section.

Hank Biasatti, who was born in Italy and raised in Canada, was the first international player in the league in 1946. The number of international players in the league rose after the formation of the Dream Team when NBA players were allowed into Olympic play starting in 1992. Global interest in basketball subsequently soared. On opening day of the 1991–92 season, NBA rosters included 23 international players from 18 countries.

In addition, the San Antonio Spurs set an all-time record for international players on an opening-night squad, with 10 during the 2013–14 season.

From European countries, France has produced 42 players, and Serbia has produced 30. From Oceania, Australia has produced 33 players while New Zealand has produced 3 players. From African countries, Nigeria and Senegal have produced 30 and 12 players respectively. From Latin American countries, Brazil and Puerto Rico have produced 18 players and Argentina has produced 16. From Asian countries, China has produced 6 players, while Japan and Lebanon have both produced 5. Among transcontinental countries, Turkey, Russia, and Georgia have produced 14, 13 and 11 players respectively.

Including the United States, 90 different countries have produced at least one NBA player in total.

Summary

Africa

Americas

Asia

Europe

Oceania

List 

Notes
 Nationality indicates a player's representative nationality.
 Birthplace indicates a player's country of birth. A blank column indicates that the player's birth country is the same to his nationality.
 Career in the NBA
 SFR Yugoslavia dissolved in 1992 into five independent countries, Bosnia and Herzegovina, Croatia, the Republic of Macedonia, Slovenia, and the Federal Republic of Yugoslavia. FR Yugoslavia was later renamed into Serbia and Montenegro in February 2003 and dissolved in June 2006 into two independent countries, Montenegro and Serbia. In 2019, Macedonia was officially renamed North Macedonia.
 Czechoslovakia dissolved on January 1, 1993 into two independent countries, the Czech Republic and Slovakia.In 2016, the Czech Republic officially began to use its geographical name Czechia. 
 Soviet Union dissolved in December 1991.  
 Germany was previously divided into two independent countries, the Federal Republic of Germany (West Germany) and German Democratic Republic (East Germany), from 1949 to 1990. Before that, however, it was formerly known as the Weimar Republic from after World War I ended in 1918 until 1933 once Adolf Hitler was elected as chancellor and produced the Enabling Act of 1933 shortly after.
 On July 9, 2011, South Sudan became independent from Sudan, following a vote for independence in a January 2011 referendum.
 Lithuania, Latvia and Estonia are considered in international law to have kept de jure independence from 1944-1991 while being de facto controlled by the Soviet Union.

Footnotes

See also

NBA
List of foreign NBA coaches
Lists of NBA players
List of current NBA players
List of NBA players by country:
List of Australian NBA players
List of Canadian NBA players
List of Croatian NBA players
List of French NBA players
List of Greek NBA players
List of Italian NBA players
List of Lithuanian NBA players
List of Montenegrin NBA players
List of Serbian NBA players
List of Turkish NBA players
Race and ethnicity in the NBA

Other leagues
List of foreign basketball players in Serbia
Foreign players in the National Football League
List of foreign WNBA players
List of NHL statistical leaders by country
List of countries with their first Major League Baseball player
List of current Major League Baseball players by nationality

References

External links
NBA.com: 2008–09 International Players
NBA.com: 2009–10 International Players
NBA.com: 2010–11 International Players
NBA Foreign Players From Small Countries

 
Foreign Nba
Employment of foreign-born